Unser Lieben Frauen Kirchhof (German: Our Loving Lady Churchyard) is a central square in Bremen between the Bremer Marktplatz, Obernstraße, Sögestraße and the Domshof. The square is used as a flower market. The appearance of the square is quite consistent: sandstone (as in the church), dark brick (as in the Rathaus) and clinker brick.

History 

The square is named after the second oldest church in Bremen, the Medieval Gothic Unser Lieben Frauen Kirche, which dominated it.

Until the end of the thirteenth century, the Friedhof lay next to the church. The original Bremen City Hall from the thirteenth century was located on the west side at the corner of Obernstraße, Sögestraße and the square. At this time the square also served increasingly as a marketplace and the Liebfrauenkirche as market church. When the City Hall was rebuilt in 1405, the Bremer Market was also moved. In the seventeenth century the Old Börse stood on the south side on the modern Obernstraße; at first it was only a simple covered stall over a wine cellar. In 1687, a one-story building was erected above the wine cellar in the Baroque style which was then still unknown in Bremen, following plans of the Council architect Jean Baptiste Broebes, who had fled from Paris. A second floor was added between 1734 and 1736 after the plans of Giselher von Warneck.

Subsequently, the old graves were removed from the little churchyard in 1813 and the fenced square was expanded; so that the Bremer Freimarkt could take place here. The first comptoir of the Sparkasse Bremen was in the Alte Börse  from 1825 to 1845. In 1888 the Alte Börse burnt down.

The Kaiser Wilhelm monument stood here from 1890/3 until it was melted down for armaments as a Metallspende (metal donation) i 1942. Today the square is surrounded on its northern and western sides by shops and offices; to the east still stands the Liebfrauenkirche with its parish house. In 1909 the decagonal Marcus Fountain, donated by Mayor Marcus, was inaugurated on the square. In the same year a Moltke monument was installed at the Liebfrauenkirche for Helmuth von Moltke.

The east side is formed by the Neues Rathaus, which was built on the location of the old Bishop's Palace in the Neo-Renaissance style, according to plans by Gabriel von Seidl and was inaugurated in 1913.

Two foodstands are located on the square, immediately next to the fencing of the Alten Börse.

Monuments

The whole square, with the following buildings is under cultural heritage management:

 Houses 6, 8–15, 17–24, 26–30
 Liebfrauenkirche from 1230
 Marcus Fountain from 1909
 Kirchhof 6: Deutsche Nationalbank from 1896
 Kirchhof 15: Office house, c. 1900
 Kirchhof 17: Office house Herms from 1909
 Kirchhof 26: Residential and commercial building of Rohlandseck from 1914

References

Squares in Bremen (city)
Former cemeteries
History of Bremen (city)